Erica scoparia, the green heather, is a shrubby species of heath in the flowering plant family Ericaceae. It is native to the western Mediterranean Basin in the Iberian Peninsula (Spain and Portugal), Northwest Africa (Morocco, Algeria and Tunisia), Southern France, Italy, Balearic Islands, Sardinia and Corsica.

Description 
Erica scoparia is a perennial evergreen shrub with small yellowish white to red-brown bell-shaped drooping flowers borne in  clusters at the ends of its shoots.

References

External links 

scoparia
Plants described in 1753
Taxa named by Carl Linnaeus